Low brass may refer to:
Low brass, a copper-zinc alloy
Low brass, a categorization of brass instruments
 Shotgun shells  using a short brass cup.